Anikó Kéry (born 31 March 1956) is a retired Hungarian gymnast. She competed at the 1972 Summer Olympics in all artistic gymnastics events and won a bronze medal in the team competition. Her best individual result was 13th place in the uneven bars. 

After retiring from competitions she toured around the world with an acrobatic show, together with her husband Attila Kapros. In 1983 she gave birth to their only child, Anikó Kapros, a professional tennis player coached by her husband.

References

1956 births
Living people
Hungarian female artistic gymnasts
Gymnasts at the 1972 Summer Olympics
Olympic gymnasts of Hungary
Olympic bronze medalists for Hungary
Olympic medalists in gymnastics
Medalists at the 1972 Summer Olympics
Gymnasts from Budapest
20th-century Hungarian women
21st-century Hungarian women